Lacosoma is a genus of sack-bearer moths in the family Mimallonidae. There are at least 30 described species in Lacosoma.

Species
These 30 species belong to the genus Lacosoma:

 Lacosoma arizonicum Dyar, 1898 c g b (southwestern sack-bearer moth)
 Lacosoma asea Schaus, 1928 c g
 Lacosoma aurora Dognin, 1916 c g
 Lacosoma bigodia Schaus, 1928 c g
 Lacosoma briasia Schaus, 1928 c g
 Lacosoma cantia Schaus, 1928 c g
 Lacosoma chiridota Grote, 1864 c g b (scalloped sack-bearer)
 Lacosoma diederica Schaus, 1928 c g
 Lacosoma julietta Dyar, 1913 c g
 Lacosoma ladema Dognin, 1920 c g
 Lacosoma lola Schaus, 1905 c g
 Lacosoma ludolpha Schaus, 1928 c g
 Lacosoma lygia Schaus, 1912 c g
 Lacosoma maldera Schaus, 1934 c g
 Lacosoma medalla Dyar, 1913 c g
 Lacosoma ostrinum Herbin, 2016 g
 Lacosoma otalla Schaus, 1905 c g
 Lacosoma oyapoca Schaus, 1928 c g
 Lacosoma perplexa Schaus, 1922 c g
 Lacosoma philastria Schaus, 1928 c g
 Lacosoma raydela Schaus, 1928 c g
 Lacosoma rosea Dognin, 1905 c g
 Lacosoma schausi Dognin, 1923 c g
 Lacosoma syrinx Druce, 1898 c g
 Lacosoma turnina Schaus, 1928 c g
 Lacosoma valera Schaus, 1928 c g
 Lacosoma valva Schaus, 1905 c g
 Lacosoma violacea Sepp, 1818 c g
 Lacosoma vulfreda Schaus, 1928 c g
 Lacosoma zonoma Schaus, 1928 c g

Data sources: i = ITIS, c = Catalogue of Life, g = GBIF, b = Bugguide.net

References

Further reading

External links

 

Mimallonidae
Moth genera